West Lawn, also known as the Embassy House Apartments, is a historic home located at Lancaster, Lancaster County, Pennsylvania. It was built in 1873–1874, and is a T-shaped dwelling with a -story main section and -story rear wing with a slate covered mansard roof in a combined Italianate / Second Empire style.  It features a -story tower with a mansard roof.  It once housed a fraternity and in 1973 was converted to apartments.

It was listed on the National Register of Historic Places in 1984.

References

Houses on the National Register of Historic Places in Pennsylvania
Italianate architecture in Pennsylvania
Second Empire architecture in Pennsylvania
Houses completed in 1874
Houses in Lancaster, Pennsylvania
National Register of Historic Places in Lancaster, Pennsylvania